The Former Yilan Prison is a former prison in Yilan City, Yilan County, Taiwan.

History
The prison was originally founded in 1896 with the name Yilan Branch Institute of Taipei Punishment Institute. It was then renamed to First Branch Prison of Taiwan First Prison in December 1945 and again to Taiwan Yilan Prison on 1 April 1947. In 1984, the prison committee bought a new land plot in Sanxing Township and the prison was then relocated and officially opened on 19 July 1993. The building is the oldest prison structure in Taiwan.

Transportation
The building is accessible within walking distance west of Yilan Station of Taiwan Railways.

See also
 List of tourist attractions in Taiwan

References

1898 establishments in Taiwan
Buildings and structures completed in 1898
Buildings and structures in Yilan County, Taiwan
Yilan Prison
Tourist attractions in Yilan County, Taiwan